Charles Cheruiyot may refer to:

 Charles Cheruiyot (born 1964), Kenyan long-distance runner
 Charles Cheruiyot (born 1988), Kenyan long-distance runner
 Charles Cheruiyot Keter, Kenyan politician